Qadimabad (also Romanized as Qadīmābād; also known as Kadimabad) is a village in Pir Yusefian Rural District. It is located in the Central District of Alborz County, Qazvin Province, Iran. At the 2006 census, its population was 1,550, in 355 families.

References 

Populated places in Alborz County